Ivan Ljavinec (18 April 1923 – 9 December 2012) was a Czech hierarch of the Ruthenian Greek Catholic Church.

Ljavinec was born in Volovec, Czechoslovakia (now in Ukraine) and ordained a priest on 28 July 1946. Ljavinec was appointed titular bishop of Acalissus as well as Apostolic Exarch of the Apostolic Exarchate in the Czech Republic on 18 January 1996 and consecrated a bishop on 30 March 1996. Ljavinec retired as apostolic exarch on 23 April 2003.

He lived as the Apostolic Exarch emeritus in the House of St. Elżbeta in Žernůvka, Czech Republic, where died. His body was transferred in Ukraine and, on 15 December 2012, buried in his native Volovec.

External links
Catholic-Hierarchy
Exarchate in the Czech Republic (Czech)

20th-century Eastern Catholic bishops
21st-century Eastern Catholic bishops
Czechoslovak bishops
Czech Eastern Catholics
Ruthenian Catholic bishops
21st-century Roman Catholic titular bishops
1923 births
2012 deaths
20th-century Roman Catholic titular bishops